The Journal of Recreational Mathematics was an American journal dedicated to recreational mathematics, started in 1968. It had generally been published quarterly by the Baywood Publishing Company, until it ceased publication with the last issue (volume 38, number 2) published in 2014.  The initial publisher (of volumes 1–5) was Greenwood Periodicals.

Harry L. Nelson was primary editor for five years (volumes 9 through 13, excepting volume 13, number 4, when the initial editor returned as lead) and Joseph Madachy, the initial lead editor and editor of a predecessor called Recreational Mathematics Magazine which ran during the years 1961 to 1964, was the editor for many years.  Charles Ashbacher and Colin Singleton took over as editors when Madachy retired (volume 30 number 1).  The final editors were Ashbacher and Lamarr Widmer.  The journal has from its inception also listed associate editors, one of whom was Leo Moser.

The journal contains:
 Original articles
 Book reviews
 Alphametics And Solutions To Alphametics
 Problems And Conjectures
 Solutions To Problems And Conjectures
 Proposer's And Solver's List For Problems And Conjectures

Indexing
The journal is indexed in:
 Academic Search Premier
 Book Review Index
 International Bibliography of Periodical Literature
 International Bibliography of Book Reviews
 Readers' Guide to Periodical Literature
 The Gale Group

References

Recreational mathematics
Mathematics journals
Publications established in 1968
Publications disestablished in 2014
Quarterly journals
Defunct journals of the United States